Russellville Municipal Airport , also known as Bill Pugh Field, is a city-owned public-use airport located three nautical miles (3.5 mi, 5.6 km) southeast of the central business district of Russellville, a city in Franklin County, Alabama, United States. It is included in the FAA's National Plan of Integrated Airport Systems for 2011–2015, which categorized it as a general aviation facility.

Facilities and aircraft 
It has one runway designated 2/20 with an asphalt surface measuring 5,500 by 75 feet (1,676 x 23 m).

For the 12-month period ending April 14, 2010, the airport had 20,125 general aviation aircraft operations, an average of 55 per day. At that time there were 14 aircraft based at this airport: 93% single-engine and 7% helicopter.

References

External links 
 Blue Diamond Aviation, the fixed-base operator
 

Airports in Alabama
Buildings and structures in Franklin County, Alabama
Transportation in Franklin County, Alabama